José Roberto Gomes Santana, commonly known as Zé Roberto (born September 13, 1978 in Pastos Bons) is an association footballer who last played for the San Diego Sockers in the Major Arena Soccer League.

Zé Roberto began his career in his native Brazil, where he played with several clubs in the lower divisions. In 2002, he went abroad to North America to sign with the Hershey Wildcats of the A-League. After the Wildcats folded, Zé Roberto was signed by the Montreal Impact in 2002. In Montreal he played an important role that would transform the Impact into a league powerhouse that would eventually dominate the league for latter part of the decade. His accolades during his tenure with Montreal include the League Championship, Regular-Season Championship, and the Voyageurs Cup. In January, 2010 he was ranked 22nd in the USL First Division Top 25 of the Decade, which announced a list of the best and most influential players of the previous decade.

Career
Midway through the 2007 season, Zé Roberto was traded to the Vancouver Whitecaps on July 26, 2007 along with Alen Marcina for Joey Gjertsen and David Testo. 
On April 9, 2008, Zé Roberto, Luke Kreamalmeyer and Leslie Fitzpatrick were signed by the Rochester Rhinos for the 2008 season.

On February 17, 2009, the Rhinos announced the re-signing of Zé Roberto and striker Chris Sanders to a one-year deal with a one-year option for 2010. They did not exercise the option, and signed with the San Diego Sockers in the Major Arena Soccer League at the end of the Rhinos' 2009 outdoor season. At age 41, Zé Roberto was still on the Sockers' roster in 2020, having played in 14 of 24 games during their 2018–19 season.

References

External links
Rochester Rhinos bio
Detroit Ignition bio
 CBF
{San Diego Sockers}
Player of the week, PASL-Pro}

1978 births
Brazilian expatriate footballers
Brazilian expatriate sportspeople in Canada
Brazilian expatriate sportspeople in the United States
Brazilian footballers
Detroit Ignition (MISL) players
Expatriate soccer players in Canada
Expatriate soccer players in the United States
Association football midfielders
Hershey Wildcats players
Living people
Major Indoor Soccer League (2001–2008) players
Montreal Impact (1992–2011) players
Sportspeople from Maranhão
Rochester New York FC players
San Diego Sockers (PASL) players
Tuna Luso Brasileira players
A-League (1995–2004) players
USL First Division players
Vancouver Whitecaps (1986–2010) players
Major Arena Soccer League players
San Diego Sockers players
Philadelphia KiXX players